Amnirana lemairei is a species of frog in the family Ranidae. It is found in Angola, Democratic Republic of the Congo, and Zambia. Its natural habitats are dry savanna and moist savanna.

References
 Channing, A. & Poynton, J.C. 2004.  Amnirana lemairei.   2006 IUCN Red List of Threatened Species.   Downloaded on 23 July 2007.

lemairei
Frogs of Africa
Amphibians of Angola
Amphibians of the Democratic Republic of the Congo
Amphibians of Zambia
Taxa named by Gaston-François de Witte
Amphibians described in 1921
Taxonomy articles created by Polbot